Crapp is a surname. Notable people with this surname include:

 Austen Robin Crapp (born 1934), Australian priest
 Ivo Crapp (1872–1924), Australian Australian rules football umpire
 Jack Crapp (1912–1981), English cricket player
 Lorraine Crapp (born 1938), Australian swimmer